Jochen Wollmert (born 22 November 1964) is a German Paralympic table tennis player.

He won his first individual Paralympic medal, a bronze, at the 1992 Summer Paralympics. Since then he has won individual gold at the 2000 and 2008 Summer Paralympics, along with other Paralympic medals and team golds. He won his third gold medal at the age of 47 at the 2012 Summer Paralympics.

References

External links
 
 

1964 births
Living people
German male table tennis players
Paralympic table tennis players of Germany
Paralympic medalists in table tennis
Paralympic gold medalists for Germany
Paralympic silver medalists for Germany
Paralympic bronze medalists for Germany
Table tennis players at the 1992 Summer Paralympics
Table tennis players at the 1996 Summer Paralympics
Table tennis players at the 2000 Summer Paralympics
Table tennis players at the 2004 Summer Paralympics
Table tennis players at the 2008 Summer Paralympics
Table tennis players at the 2012 Summer Paralympics
Medalists at the 1992 Summer Paralympics
Medalists at the 1996 Summer Paralympics
Medalists at the 2000 Summer Paralympics
Medalists at the 2004 Summer Paralympics
Medalists at the 2008 Summer Paralympics
Medalists at the 2012 Summer Paralympics
Place of birth missing (living people)
Recipients of the Order of Merit of Baden-Württemberg
Sportspeople from Wuppertal